Sirwan District is a district of the Halabja Governorate, Iraq.

References 

 

Districts of Halabja Province